Tomislav Rukavina (born 14 October 1974) is a Croatian professional football manager and former player who is the manager of the Croatia national U-17 team.

Club career
In 1992 Rukavina started his football career in his hometown of Osijek, before moving to NK Zagreb during his second season. After 57 appearances for NK Zagreb, he was transferred to Dinamo (then called Croatia Zagreb), where he won four national championships. He played four seasons in Italy for S.S.C. Venezia before returning to his homeland and finishing his career at Hajduk Split. He won the HNL seven times and the Croatian cup three times.

International career
Rukavina made his international debut for the Croatia national team against Poland in the 2–1 friendly win at Rijeka on 28 February 1996. He made five appearances for Croatia. His final international was a November 1999 friendly away against France.

Managerial career
Rukavina became first team coach at Dinamo Zagreb in March 2009., after arriving of Krunoslav Jurčić.

References

External links
 
 Tomislav Rukavina at the Croatian Football Federation
 

1974 births
Living people
Sportspeople from Osijek
Association football fullbacks
Croatian footballers
Croatia international footballers
NK Osijek players
NK Zagreb players
GNK Dinamo Zagreb players
Venezia F.C. players
HNK Hajduk Split players
Croatian Football League players
Serie A players
Serie B players
Croatian expatriate footballers
Expatriate footballers in Italy
Croatian expatriate sportspeople in Italy
Croatian football managers
NK Osijek managers
Croatian Football League managers
GNK Dinamo Zagreb non-playing staff